Chichagof Harbor is an inlet on the northeast coast of the island of Attu in the Aleutian Islands in Alaska. It is named after Russian Admiral and polar explorer Vasily Chichagov.
It is the location of the Aleut village served by an American pastor and his wife.  It was also where some heavy fighting took place during the recapture of the island from the Japanese during the Battle of Attu in World War II and afterwards was the site of Battery B 42nd Coast Artillery Battalion.

Notes

References
Merriam-Webster's Geographical Dictionary, Third Edition. Springfield, Massachusetts: Merriam-Webster, Incorporated, 1997. .

External links

Attu Island
Bodies of water of Aleutians West Census Area, Alaska
Inlets of Alaska